Pindrop may refer to:

Pindrop (album), a 1980 album by The Passage
Pindrop Security, an American information security company

See also

Pin Drop Studio, a British arts and entertainment studio